Hungary participated in the Eurovision Song Contest 2014 in Copenhagen, Denmark. Their entry was selected through the national competition A Dal, organised by the Hungarian broadcaster Magyar Televízió (MTV). András Kállay-Saunders represented Hungary with the song "Running", which qualified from the first semi-final and placed 5th in the final, scoring 143 points. It is the second best position ever for Hungary, after 4th place in their debut year 1994.

Before Eurovision

A Dal 2014 
A Dal 2014 was the third edition of A Dal which selected the Hungarian entry for the Eurovision Song Contest 2014. Thirty entries competed in the competition that consisted of three shows which commenced on 25 January 2014 and concluded with an eight-song final on 22 February 2014. All shows in the competition were broadcast on m1 and Duna TV World.

Format 
The format of the competition consisted of six shows: three heats, two semi-finals and a final. The six shows took place at MTVA studios in Budapest and were hosted by Éva Novodomszky and Gábor Gundel Takács, with Levente Harsányi and Krisztina Rátonyi conducting backstage interviews. Last year's winner, ByeAlex, also took part in the show as a digital commentator, providing reports and facts regarding the competition. The three heats, held on 25 January 2014, 1 February 2014 and 8 February 2014, each featured ten entries with six advancing to the semi-finals from each show. The semi-finals, held on 15 and 16 February 2014 during A Dal-hétvége (A Dal-weekend), each featured nine entries with four advancing to the final from each show. The final, held on 22 February 2014, selected the Hungarian entry for Copenhagen from the eight remaining entries.

Voting 
Results during each show were determined by each member of the four-member judging panel and votes from the public. During the heats and the semi-finals, two rounds of voting determined which entries advanced to the next stages of the competition. In the first round of voting, each judge assigned scores to each entry ranging from 1 (lowest score) to 10 (highest score) immediately after the artist(s) conclude their performance. The summation of the judges scores determined the final scores for the first round. In the heats, the top three entries with the highest scores advanced to the semi-finals. In the semi-finals, the top two entries with the highest scores advanced to the final in the first round of voting. In the case of a tie among the entries in the first round of voting, the judging panel would deliberate and determine which entries would advance. In the second round of voting, the remaining entries that did not qualify during the first round faced a public vote via submitting an SMS. The three entries that received the most votes from each heat would also advance to the semi-finals, while the two entries that received the most votes from each semi-final would also advance to the final. In the case of a tie during the second round of voting, the entry which received a higher score during the first round of voting would advance and should a tie still persist, the judging panel would deliberate and determine which entry advanced.

In the final, the eight remaining entries also faced two rounds of voting. In the first round, the judges assigned points to their four preferred entries: 4 (lowest), 6, 8 and 10 (highest). The top four entries determined by the judges qualified to the second round of voting. In the second round, a public vote exclusively determined the winning entry.

Judges 
The judging panel participated in each show by providing feedback to the competing artists and selecting entries to advance in the competition. The panel consisted of:

Kati Kovács – Singer, lyricist and actress
Jenő Csiszár – Radio anchor
Magdi Rúzsa – Singer who represented Hungary in 2007 in Helsinki with "Unsubstantial Blues"
Philip Rákay – MTV programme director

Competing entries
Artists and composers were able to submit their applications and entries for the competition between 10 October 2013 and 1 December 2013. Competing artists were required to either hold Hungarian citizenship or be able to speak Hungarian fluently. Artists were permitted to collaborate with international composers and submit songs in English and/or in a recognised minority language in Hungary, however, in such cases a translation of the lyrics to Hungarian were required. After the submission deadline had passed, a record 435 entries were received by the broadcaster. A ten-member preselection jury selected thirty entries for the competition. The competing entries were announced during a press conference on 11 December 2013. Among the competing artists was former Eurovision Song Contest entrant Gergő Rácz (competing as a member of Fool Moon), who represented Hungary in the 1997 Contest as a member of V.I.P.

Shows

Heats 
Three heats took place on 25 January, 1 February and 8 February 2014. In each heat ten entries competed and six entries qualified to the semi-finals after two rounds of voting. In the first round of voting, three qualifiers were determined by the combination of scores from each judge. In the second round of voting, the remaining seven entries that were not in the initial top three faced a public vote consisting of votes submitted through SMS in order to determine three additional qualifiers.

Semi-finals 
Two semi-finals took place on 15 and 16 February 2014. In each semi-final nine entries competed and four entries qualified to the final after two rounds of voting. In the first round of voting, two qualifiers were determined by the combination of scores from each judge. In the second round of voting, the remaining seven entries that were not in the initial top two faced a public vote consisting of votes submitted through SMS in order to determine two additional qualifiers.

Final 
The final took place on 22 February 2014 where the eight entries that qualified from the semi-finals competed. The winner of the competition was selected over two rounds of voting. In the first round, the jury determined the top four entries that advanced to the second round. The voting system for the four jurors was different from the method used in the heats and semi-finals. Each juror announced their scores after all songs had been performed rather than assigning scores following each performance and the jurors ranked their preferred top four entries and assigned points in the following manner: 4 (lowest), 6, 8 and 10 (highest). The four entries with the highest total scores proceeded to the second round. In the second round, "Running" performed by András Kállay-Saunders was selected as the winner via a public vote consisting of votes submitted through SMS. 145,000 votes were registered in the second round.

At Eurovision 

During the semi-final allocation draw on 20 January 2014 at the Copenhagen City Hall, Hungary was drawn to compete in the second half of the first semi-final on 6 May 2014. In the first semi-final, the producers of the show decided that Hungary would close the semi-final and perform 16th, following Montenegro. Hungary qualified from the first semi-final and competed in the final on 10 May 2014. During the winner's press conference for the first semi-final qualifiers, Hungary was allocated to compete in the second half of the final. In the final, the producers of the show decided that Hungary would perform 21st, following Switzerland and preceding Malta. Hungary placed 5th in the final, scoring 143 points.

On stage, András Kállay-Saunders was joined by dancers Alexandra Likovics and Tibor Nagy and backing vocalists Rozina Cselovszky and Kyra Fedor. The Hungarian performance was based on the song's theme of domestic violence with the choreography between the two dancers resembling a fight. The LED projections during the performance transitioned from a nighttime cityscape during the verses to fast moving red lines during the chorus.

In Hungary, both the semi-finals and the final were broadcast on M1 with commentary by Gábor Gundel Takács. The Hungarian spokesperson revealing the result of the Hungarian vote in the final was Éva Novodomszky.

Voting

Points awarded to Hungary

Points awarded by Hungary

Detailed voting results
The following members comprised the Hungarian jury:
 Zoltan Palásti KovácsChairperson – musical teacher, music historian, musician, DJ, producer
 Kati Kovácsperformer, singer, songwriter
 DJ, music producer, record company owner
 musician, producer, songwriter, sound engineer
 singer, songwriter, lyricist

References

External links 
 A Dal 2014 official website

2014
Countries in the Eurovision Song Contest 2014
Eurovision